The Chartbusters were an American rock band from Washington, D.C. The group's lone hit single was the 1964 song "She's the One", which had an 8-week chart run and peaked at #33 in August 1964 on the Billboard Hot 100. "She's the One" was released on Mutual Records after 20 other record labels had turned it down.

The Chartbusters featured lead guitarist/vocalist Vernon Sandusky, who began his career with Bobby Poe and The Poe Kats. Bobby Poe was the manager and often co-producer of this new group. In the 1970s, Vernon Sandusky went on to play guitar in Roy Clark's band for the next 20 years.

The Chartbusters recorded several singles from 1964 to 1968, but none reached the sales and chart heights of "She's the One". Their second single "Why" did make the Billboard chart, but only went as high as #92. Over the relatively brief period of their career, The Chartbusters recorded several singles for Mutual Records, Crusader Records and Bell Records, but never recorded an album for any of those labels. A compilation album of these singles - along with unreleased tracks and demos - was released on compact disc in the 1990s by the German label Eagle Records.

The Chartbusters were a popular live band and performed shows with many of the stars of the day, including The Animals, The Four Seasons, Jan and Dean, Johnny Rivers, The Lovin' Spoonful, Peter and Gordon, Chuck Berry, Dino, Desi and Billy and many more. Some of the aforementioned artists also performed with The Chartbusters at a weekend of music held at The DC Armory in Washington, DC in April 1966, which was called "The National Teen Show". For several years during the mid-to-late 1960s, The Chartbusters were also the house band at The Crazy Horse in the Georgetown section of Washington, D.C.

Although Vernon Sandusky, founding member of the band repeatedly has said it is not true, local Washington, DC legend has it that The Chartbusters also released several quickly recorded budget albums for Diplomat Records (a subsidiary of Synthetic Plastics Company) circa 1964 under the name "The Manchesters," including Beatlerama Volume 1 (Diplomat D-2307 mono and DS-2307 stereo) and Beatlerama Volume 2 (Diplomat D-2310 mono and DS-2310 stereo). These albums contained cover versions of several Beatles' songs along with (according to Sandusky) unauthorized versions of The Chartbusters' original songs/demos, including some which appeared in alternate versions on their Mutual Records singles.

In the 1990s, Tom Hanks was quoted in People saying that The Chartbusters were one of the inspirations for his film That Thing You Do!. (Note that there was also a band called The Chartbusters in the San Francisco Bay Area, where Hanks grew up, but this note may be a reference to the Jazz group The Chartbusters, who recorded for the Concord Music Group in the 1990s and had a member born in Oakland.)

Lead singer and guitarist Vernon Sandusky (born on June 30, 1939, in Earlham, Iowa) died at his home in Enda, Kansas, on January 25, 2020, at the age of 80.

Members
Vernon Sandusky - lead guitar, lead vocals
Vince Gedeon - guitar, vocals
John Dubas - bass, vocals
Mitch Corday - drums (became booking agent for the band)
Chib Holmes - drums (replaced Mitch Corday)

Additional members
Frank Dillon - guitar, vocals
Eddie Kopa - guitar, vocals
Gary Kingery - drums
Mike "Pokey" Walls - drums
Stuart Ross - drums
Danny Motta - drums
Ronnie Stevens - drums

References

External links
 The Chartbusters Official website
 

Musical groups from Washington, D.C.